The following outline is provided as an overview of and topical guide to Eritrea:

Eritrea – country in the Horn of Africa. Eritrea is the Italian form of the Greek name , meaning "red [land]". With its capital at Asmara, it is bordered by Sudan in the west, Ethiopia in the south, and Djibouti in the southeast. The northeastern and eastern parts of Eritrea have an extensive coastline along the Red Sea, directly across from Saudi Arabia and Yemen.

Eritrea is a multi-ethnic country, with nine recognized ethnic groups. It has a population of around six million inhabitants. Most residents speak Afro-Asiatic languages, either of the Semitic or Cushitic branches. Among these communities, the Tigrayan make up about 55% of the population, with the Tigre constituting around 30% of inhabitants. In addition, there are a number of Nilo-Saharan-speaking Nilotic ethnic minorities. Most people in the territory adhere to Christianity or Islam.

General reference

 Pronunciation:  or 
 Common English country name: Eritrea
 Official English country name: The State of Eritrea
 Common endonym(s):  
 Official endonym(s):  
 Adjectival(s): Eritrean
 Demonym(s):
 ISO country codes: ER, ERI, 232
 ISO region codes: See ISO 3166-2:ER
 Internet country code top-level domain: .er

Geography of Eritrea 

Geography of Eritrea
 Eritrea is: a country
 Location:
 Eastern Hemisphere and Northern Hemisphere
 Africa
 North Africa
 East Africa
 Horn of Africa
 Time zone:  East Africa Time (UTC+03)
 Extreme points of Eritrea
 High:  Emba Soira 
 Low:  Lake Kulul 
 Land boundaries:  1,626 km
 912 km
 605 km
 109 km
 Coastline:  Red Sea 2,234 km
 Population of Eritrea: 6,333,000 (July 2013 UN estimate) 107th most populous country

 Area of Eritrea: 117,600 km2
 Atlas of Eritrea

Environment of Eritrea 

Environment of Eritrea
 Climate of Eritrea
 Environmental issues in Eritrea
 Ecoregions in Eritrea
 Geology of Eritrea
 Earthquakes in Eritrea
 Protected areas of Eritrea
 National parks of Eritrea
 Wildlife of Eritrea
 Fauna of Eritrea
 Birds of Eritrea
 Mammals of Eritrea

Natural geographic features of Eritrea 

 Glaciers in Eritrea: none 
 Islands of Eritrea
 Mountains of Eritrea
 Volcanoes in Eritrea
 Rivers of Eritrea
 World Heritage Sites in Eritrea: None

Regions of Eritrea

Ecoregions of Eritrea 

List of ecoregions in Eritrea

Administrative divisions of Eritrea 

Administrative divisions of Eritrea
 Regions of Eritrea
 Districts of Eritrea

Regions of Eritrea 

Regions of Eritrea

Districts of Eritrea 

Districts of Eritrea

Municipalities of Eritrea 

 Capital of Eritrea: Asmara
 Cities of Eritrea

Demography of Eritrea 

Demographics of Eritrea

Government and politics of Eritrea 

Politics of Eritrea
 Form of government: presidential republic
 Capital of Eritrea: Asmara
 Elections in Eritrea
 Political parties in Eritrea

Branches of the government of Eritrea 

Government of Eritrea

Executive branch of the government of Eritrea 
 Head of state: President of Eritrea,
 Head of government: Prime Minister of Eritrea,

Legislative branch of the government of Eritrea 

 Parliament of Eritrea (bicameral)
 Upper house: Senate of Eritrea
 Lower house: House of Commons of Eritrea

Judicial branch of the government of Eritrea 

Court system of Eritrea

Foreign relations of Eritrea 

Foreign relations of Eritrea
 Diplomatic missions in Eritrea
 Diplomatic missions of Eritrea

International organization membership 
The State of Eritrea is a member of:

African, Caribbean, and Pacific Group of States (ACP)
African Development Bank Group (AfDB)
African Union (AU)
Common Market for Eastern and Southern Africa (COMESA)
Food and Agriculture Organization (FAO)
Group of 77 (G77)
International Atomic Energy Agency (IAEA)
International Bank for Reconstruction and Development (IBRD)
International Civil Aviation Organization (ICAO)
International Criminal Court (ICCt) (signatory)
International Criminal Police Organization (Interpol)
International Development Association (IDA)
International Federation of Red Cross and Red Crescent Societies (IFRCS) (observer)
International Finance Corporation (IFC)
International Fund for Agricultural Development (IFAD)
International Labour Organization (ILO)
International Maritime Organization (IMO)
International Monetary Fund (IMF)
International Olympic Committee (IOC)

International Organization for Standardization (ISO) (correspondent)
International Telecommunication Union (ITU)
International Trade Union Confederation (ITUC)
League of Arab States (LAS) (observer)
Multilateral Investment Guarantee Agency (MIGA)
Nonaligned Movement (NAM)
Organisation for the Prohibition of Chemical Weapons (OPCW)
Permanent Court of Arbitration (PCA)
United Nations (UN)
United Nations Conference on Trade and Development (UNCTAD)
United Nations Educational, Scientific, and Cultural Organization (UNESCO)
United Nations Industrial Development Organization (UNIDO)
Universal Postal Union (UPU)
World Customs Organization (WCO)
World Federation of Trade Unions (WFTU)
World Health Organization (WHO)
World Intellectual Property Organization (WIPO)
World Meteorological Organization (WMO)
World Tourism Organization (UNWTO)

Law and order in Eritrea 

Law of Eritrea
 Constitution of Eritrea
 Human rights in Eritrea
 LGBT rights in Eritrea
 Freedom of religion in Eritrea
 Law enforcement in Eritrea

Military of Eritrea 

Military of Eritrea
 Command
 Commander-in-chief
 Forces
 Army of Eritrea
 Navy of Eritrea
 Air Force of Eritrea

Local government in Eritrea 

Local government in Eritrea

History of Eritrea 

History of Eritrea
Current events of Eritrea
 Italian Eritrea
 Eritrea Governorate

Culture of Eritrea 

Culture of Eritrea
 Cuisine of Eritrea
 Italian eritrean cuisine
 Languages of Eritrea
 Media in Eritrea
 Museums in Eritrea
 National symbols of Eritrea
 Coat of arms of Eritrea
 Flag of Eritrea
 National anthem of Eritrea
 People of Eritrea
 Prostitution in Eritrea
 Public holidays in Eritrea
 Religion in Eritrea
 Christianity in Eritrea
 Catholicism in Eritrea
 Hinduism in Eritrea
 Islam in Eritrea
 Judaism in Eritrea
 Sikhism in Eritrea
 World Heritage Sites in Eritrea: None

Art in Eritrea 
 Literature of Eritrea
 Music of Eritrea

Sports in Eritrea 

Sports in Eritrea
 Football in Eritrea
 Eritrea at the Olympics
 Tour of Eritrea

Economy and infrastructure of Eritrea 

Economy of Eritrea
 Economic rank, by nominal GDP (2007): 161st (one hundred and sixty first)
 Agriculture in Eritrea
 Banking in Eritrea
 National Bank of Eritrea
 Communications in Eritrea
 Internet in Eritrea
 Companies of Eritrea
Currency of Eritrea: Nakfa
ISO 4217: ERN
 Energy in Eritrea
 Mining in Eritrea
 Tourism in Eritrea
 Transport in Eritrea
 Health care in Eritrea
 Transportation in Eritrea
 Airports in Eritrea
 Rail transport in Eritrea

Education in Eritrea 

Education in Eritrea

Health in Eritrea 

 Health in Eritrea
 COVID-19 pandemic in Eritrea
 COVID-19 vaccination in Eritrea

See also 

Eritrea

Index of Eritrea-related articles
List of Eritrea-related topics
List of international rankings
Member state of the United Nations
Outline of Africa
Outline of geography

References

External links

 Government
 Official website of the Ministry of Information of Eritrea
 Official website of the Ministry of Education of Eritrea

 Other
 Tigrinya online learning with numbers, alphabet and history [Eritrea and north Ethiopia (Tigray-Province)]
 Eritrea About Eritrea
 CIA World Factbook - Eritrea
 History of Eritrea: First recordings - Munzinger - exploitation by colonialism and fight against colonialism (Italy, England, Ethiopia, Soviet Union, USA, Israel) - independence 
 The Carter Center information on Eritrea (chronology)

Eritrea